The Jacob Clearwater House in Springfield, Oregon was listed on the National Register of Historic Places in 2017.

It was home to the Clearwater family who transited the Oregon Trail and homesteaded  in 1865 along the Middle Fork of the Willamette River.  It was built in 1874 and is one of only four houses from 1874 or before in the Springfield area.

It is a Gothic Revival-style house.

The listing includes  of land containing the house and a historic water tower.

References

Further reading 
 Larson, David and Deanna. Photos by Deanna Larson. "Jacob Clearwater Farmhouse, National Register Nomination." (2017)

External links
The Jacob Clearwater Farmhouse, YouTube video

National Register of Historic Places in Lane County, Oregon
Houses completed in 1874
Springfield, Oregon
1874 establishments in Oregon
Houses in Lane County, Oregon